Patrick James Cummins (born 8 May 1993) is an Australian international cricketer who captains the Australian cricket team in Test and ODI cricket. A right-arm fast bowler, he is currently regarded as being among the best bowlers in Test cricket. As of January 2023, Cummins is rated as the number one bowler in the world in the ICC test bowling rankings.

Cummins made his Test debut at the age of 18 in 2011. Injuries then forced him out of international cricket until 2015, and out of Test cricket until 2017. After the completion of the 2019 cricket season, Cummins was awarded both the Allan Border Medal for best Australian cricketer of the year and was named the ICC Test cricketer of the year.

Early life
Cummins grew up in Mount Riverview in the Blue Mountains with his two brothers and two sisters. He attended St Paul's Grammar School. As a child he idolised Brett Lee, with whom he later briefly played domestic and international cricket.

At the age of three, Cummins lost the top of his middle finger on his dominant right hand when his sister accidentally slammed a door on it.

Cummins played junior cricket for the Glenbrook-Blaxland Cricket Club in the Blue Mountains before playing first-grade cricket for Penrith District Cricket Club in 2010. That same year, Cummins represented NSW in the National Under-17 championships and later the NSW Under-19 side.

Early career 
In the preliminary final of the 2010–11 KFC Twenty20 Big Bash against Tasmania, Cummins took 4 for 16 and was named Man of the Match. He finished as the equal leading wicket-taker in the tournament.

In March 2011, Cummins made his first-class debut against Tasmania, aged 17. He returned figures of 2/80. Cummins played the final three matches of the 2010/11 Sheffield Shield season, including the final where he bowled 65 overs for the match. He was later ruled out of the Australia A tour of Zimbabwe due to a back injury.

International career

Early career and injury struggles 
Cummins was granted a Cricket Australia contract in June 2011 and in October 2011, he played two Twenty20 International (T20I) and three One Day International (ODI) matches for Australia against South Africa, claiming ten wickets and subsequently being selected in the Australian Test squad to play South Africa.

Cummins made his test match debut at Wanderers Stadium in Johannesburg in November 2011, in what was only his fourth career first-class match, becoming Australia's youngest Test cricketer since Ian Craig in 1953, aged 18 years and 193 days. Cummins took 1/38 and 6/79, becoming the second youngest test cricketer (behind Enamul Haque Jr.) to take six wickets in an innings. He then scored 13 runs in the second innings, including a four to win the match and was presented with the Man of the Match award.

After playing through his test debut with a heel injury, Cummins was subsequently ruled out of the entire 2011/12 summer.

Cummins was selected in Australia's provisional team for the ICC Under-19 World Cup to be held in Queensland in August 2012. Cummins represented Australia in the 2012 T20 World Cup and the Sydney Sixers in the 2012 Champions League, but was diagnosed with a stress fracture in his back upon his return to Australia in November, again ruling him out of the 2012/13 home summer.

Cummins returned for Australia A in August 2013, but a reoccurrence of the stress fracture in his back caused him to miss the majority of the 2013/14 summer. He returned to the BBL in January 2014 after working with Dennis Lillee during his layoffs to re-shape his bowling action.

After prioritising white ball cricket during 2014, Cummins was selected in the Australian squad for their successful 2015 World Cup campaign, playing in four matches.

Cummins was a late call-up for 2015 Ashes squad after the retirement of Ryan Harris, but he was not selected for a test during the series. He was part of the ODI and T20I series in the same tour. During the ODI leg of the tour, Cummins' stress fracture resurfaced and he was ruled out of the entire home summer for the fourth time in five years.

Cummins made his return to domestic cricket in 2016, becoming a key member of the New South Wales one day squad and the Sydney Thunder as he remained fit and played 25 matches in just over 4 months.

Return to Test cricket 
On 7 March 2017, Cummins played in the Sheffield Shield for the first time in six years, his last match being the 2011 final against Tasmania. He bowled 36 overs and claimed 8 wickets. Despite NSW medical staff recommending a slow and managed return to red ball cricket, Mitchell Starc was ruled out of the ongoing Border Gavaskar Trophy and Cummins was selected as his replacement for the third test.

After 1946 days (or 5 years, 3 months and 27 days) of absence due to various injuries, Cummins returned to test cricket on 16 March 2017. He alleviated any fears over his injury history, bowling 79 overs in the final two Test matches.

Cummins retained his spot in the side for the 2017–18 Ashes series, taking 23 wickets, leading the wicket taking tally. He also established himself as a handy lower order batter, scoring two scores in the 40s during the series as Australia was victorious 4–0.

Cummins scored his first test half-century in the fourth test against South Africa during Australia's tour of South Africa in 2017–18. In this series, he solidified his place as one of Australia's most reliable and consistent bowlers, playing in all four matches and claiming 22 wickets. He was then rested for the tour of the UAE vs Pakistan in October 2018 as he managed a back injury.

He returned for the 2018/19 test series against India, claiming 14 wickets in four tests in a beaten Australian side.

Australia vice-captaincy 

In January 2019, Cummins became one of Australia's two test vice-captains, alongside Travis Head. He played in both tests against the touring Sri Lankans and was the chief architect of Australia's innings win in the first test at the Gabba, taking his maiden 10-wicket haul. He finished the series with 14 wickets and was named as the player of the series.

Cummins was awarded the Allan Border Medal in February 2019 as the most outstanding Australian cricketer over the previous 12 months. He was the first bowler to receive this honour since 2014, and just the fourth overall. In early 2019, Cummins became the world's number 1 ranked test bowler, the first Australian since Glenn McGrath to achieve this.

He played in the limited-overs series against India which began in the same month, taking a five-wicket haul in the fourth ODI of the series. In April, he was named in Australia's squad for the 2019 Cricket World Cup held in England, and during the tournament played in his 50th ODI.

He went on to play in the 2019 Ashes series which followed the World Cup. In the first test he claimed his 100th test wicket, the fastest Australian since World War II to do so. After the second test at Lords, he reached an ICC test bowling ranking of 914 - the equal fifth of all time and highest by an Australian. Cummins was the leading wicket-taker for the series, taking 29 wickets in the five matches, at an average of 19.62.

Cummins enjoyed another successful home summer, taking 20 wickets in five tests against Pakistan and New Zealand as Australia remained unbeaten and Cummins was elevated to the role of sole vice-captain of the side. Cummins was one of five Australians to be named in the 2019 ICC Test Team of the Year and was named as the 2019 ICC Men's Test Cricketer of the Year.

In February 2020, Cummins took his 100th wicket in ODI cricket, in the first match of Australia's tour of South Africa.

During the 2020/21 Border Gavaskar Trophy Cummins claimed a series-leading 21 wickets at an average of 20.04, and was named player of the series despite Australia suffering a 2–1 loss.

In August 2021, Cummins was named in Australia's squad for the 2021 ICC Men's T20 World Cup. He played in all of the matches, taking five wickets with an economy rate of 7.37 as Australia won the tournament for the first time.

Australian captaincy

On 26 November 2021, Cummins was announced as the 47th captain of the Australian Test cricket team following the resignation of Tim Paine. Steve Smith was announced as his vice-captain, marking Smith's return to a leadership position after the 2018 ball-tampering scandal. Cummins was the first fast bowler to take on the role of full-time Australian captain in history. He took seven wickets in his first test as captain during the first match of the 2021–22 Ashes series, including a five wicket haul in the first innings, a first for an Australian seam bowling captain. Despite being absent from the 2nd test of the series after being a close contact of a COVID-19 case at a Adelaide restaurant, Cummins was the leading wicket-taker for the third consecutive Ashes series, with 21 wickets in 4 matches. Under his captaincy, Australia defeated England 4–0.

Under the captaincy of Pat Cummins, Australia toured Pakistan after 24 years since their last visit in 1998. Cummins was a leading wicket taker in the inaugural Benaud-Qadir Trophy series along with Nathan Lyon. He picked 12 wickets across three Test matches with a 22.50 bowling average. Cummins took his seventh 5-wicket haul in the first innings of the third Test match in Lahore and 3 wickets in the second innings, which helped Australia to go on and win the series 1–0 in Pakistan.

On 17 November 2022, Cummins captained Australia for the first time in ODIs after Aaron Finch retired from ODI cricket,

Cummins will be leading Australia against 4-Match Border-Gavaskaer Trophy starting from 9th Feb in VCA Jamtha.

Indian Premier League career

Cummins made his Indian Premier League debut in IPL 2014, the 2014 edition of the tournament, playing for Kolkata Knight Riders, to whom he returned for IPL 2015. He was not involved in IPL 2016 and played for Delhi Daredevils in IPL 2017. He was absent from IPL 2018 and IPL 2019.

In the IPL 2020 auction, Cummins was bought back by Knight Riders for 15.5 crore (approximately $A3.2 million), making him one of the most expensive overseas players in IPL auction history. He stayed with Knight Riders for IPL 2021 and will play for them again in IPL 2022 after taking a huge pay cut by selling for 7.25 crore (approximately $A1.35m). In an interview, Cummins said he is 'absolutely pumped' to return to Knight Riders.

Cummins played in 37 IPL matches from 2014 to 2021, taking 38 wickets. In IPL 2021, he played in seven matches and took nine wickets, also scoring 93 runs. In April 2022, Cummins tied the record for fastest half-century in the Indian Premier league in IPL 2022, scoring 50 runs in 14 balls against the Mumbai Indians. He shares this record with KL Rahul.

Personal life
Cummins attended University of Technology, Sydney under its Elite Athlete Program, graduating in 2017 with a Bachelor of Business.

In February 2020, Cummins got engaged to his longtime girlfriend Becky Boston; the couple have a son. They married on 1 August 2022.

His mother Maria Cummins passed away on 10 March 2023 after a prolonged period of illness.

References

External links

Pat Cummins at Cricket Australia
Pat Cummins at Howstat

1993 births
Allan Border Medal winners
Australia One Day International cricketers
Australia Test cricketers
Australia Twenty20 International cricketers
Australian cricketers
Cricketers at the 2015 Cricket World Cup
Cricketers at the 2019 Cricket World Cup
Cricketers from Sydney
Cricketers who have taken five wickets on Test debut
Living people
Perth Scorchers cricketers
New South Wales cricketers
Sportsmen from New South Wales
Sydney Sixers cricketers
Sydney Thunder cricketers
People from the Blue Mountains (New South Wales)
Wisden Cricketers of the Year
Kolkata Knight Riders cricketers
Australia Test cricket captains